Soneva, formerly Soneva Resorts and Residences, is a resort chain founded in Maldives in 1995 by Sonu Shivdasani and his wife Eva Malmström Shivdasani.

History 
Soneva started as a resort brand under the company Six Senses BVI, founded by Sonu Shivdasani and Eva Malmström Shivdasani in 1995.

In 2012, the Shivdasanis sold the Six Senses and Evason branded resort and spa management contracts, and related intellectual property rights, to Pegasus Capital Advisors. The Shivdasanis also sold Soneva Gili  (now known as Gili Lankanfushi) and concentrate on resorts with residences, as part of the "One Owner, One Operator, One Philosophy, One Brand" strategy under Soneva. Following the change of Maldivian law in December 2010, Soneva Fushi became one of the first resorts in the Maldives to offer residences to foreigners for purchase under leasehold. A 4 bedroom villa at Soneva Fushi was the first leasehold residential property to be sold in the Maldives in March 2011.

Soneva Fushi is regarded as the first luxury hotel in the Maldives, setting of the trend of luxury holidays in the nation. It was the first "Robinson Crusoe" styled resort in the Maldives  and also offered the first wine cellar in the Maldives. 
 1995: Creation of Six Senses BVI and Soneva brand
 1995: Soneva Fushi opens on the island of Kunfunadhoo, Maldives, with 48 villas
 2001: Soneva Gili, the first resort in the Maldives to be completely over water, opens
 2001: First Evason hotel opens in Phuket
 2004: First Six Senses property opens in Hua Hin
 2007: Eco Centro opens at Soneva Fushi; the Maldives' first integrated waste management centre
 2008: Soneva Fushi debuts the first astronomy observatory in the Maldives
 2008: Soneva introduces 2% carbon levy to offset carbon emissions
 2008: Soneva bans branded bottled water
 2009: Soneva Kiri opens in Koh Kood, Thailand
 2010: Soneva Foundation is founded
 2011: Sale of private residences at Soneva Fushi begins
 2012: Split and sale of Six Senses, Evason, and Soneva Gili (now known as Gili Lankanfushi). Soneva is retained by Sonu and Eva Shivdasani as a separate brand under the “one owner, one brand” philosophy.
 2014: Soneva Fushi opens first Art and Glass studio in the Maldives
 2015: Soneva in Aqua sets sail
 October 2016: Soneva Jani opens with residences available for purchase The resort currently feature 24 over water villas and two on land - expansions plans are currently underway to build more beach villas.
December 2020: Soneva Jani Chapter 2 opens, including 28 overwater retreats - with the new accommodation came the launch of Soneva's first all-inclusive product which includes all food and experiences.
 2022: Major fire at Soneva Kiri resort causes 34 Million Bhat in damages to personal property and injuries to two guests of the resort. Thai authorities file criminal complaint against three Soneva Executives.

Locations 
Soneva owns and manages Soneva Fushi (Baa Atoll) and Soneva Jani (Noonu Atoll) in the Maldives, as well as Soneva Kiri (Koh Kood) in Thailand.

Soneva also owns and manages a two bedroom luxury yacht, the Soneva in Aqua.

Future locations 
Three more locations are underdevelopment, two to be located in the Maldives (one in the North and one in the South) and the other to be on Okinawa, Japan.

The Soneva Foundation 
The Soneva Foundation is a UK registered charity (number 113811) founded in 2010. It is funded by Soneva's 2% carbon levy on room revenue and profits from the sale of water bottled on the property.

One project is focused on the restoration of forests in northern Thailand, in Chiang Mai where 452,000 trees were planted. A Framework Species Methodology was used, and 90 different species of trees were planted with guidance from the Forest Restoration Research Unit at Chiang Mai University. Three main sites were restored: at Si Lanna National Park, The Royal Project at Nong Hoi, and the Pai River Watershed Wildlife Sanctuary.

The Soneva Foundation has also implemented 488 projects in 53 countries to improve access to safe drinking water or basic sanitation. These projects turned into the WHOLE WORLD Water (WWW) campaign, which was co-founded by the foundation, together with Karena Albers and Jenifer Willig in 2013. Hotels and restaurants who join the campaign filter and bottle their own drinking water in reusable glass bottles, and donate 10 percent of the profits in sales to the WWW fund. In many places including the Maldives, this process saves the property money as they cut down on costs associated with the transportation and disposal of imported plastic-bottled water. Several properties have joined the campaign, including Fairmont Hotels, several Ritz-Carlton properties, Virgin Limited Edition hotels, Raffles Hotels and Auberge du Soleil

The Soneva Foundation also holds the annual SLOW LIFE Symposium, from which WHOLE WORLD Water was formed. Business leaders, scientists, NGOs, renowned thinkers and policy makers convene with the goal of implementing positive change in the world that is also good for business.

References

External links 
 Official website

Hotel chains